Charles Cole (born June 21, 1986 in New York City, New York) is an American rower. He is a graduate of Yale and Kellogg College, Oxford, where he competed on the rowing team.

Charlie was USRowing's Athlete of the Year in 2011.

During the 2012 Summer Olympics, he competed in the Coxless Four and won a bronze medal.

References

 
 

1986 births
Living people
Rowers at the 2012 Summer Olympics
Rowers at the 2016 Summer Olympics
Olympic bronze medalists for the United States in rowing
Yale University alumni
Alumni of Kellogg College, Oxford
Medalists at the 2012 Summer Olympics
Oxford University Boat Club rowers
American male rowers